Leonardo Máximo Sbaraglia (born 30 June 1970) is an Argentine actor, with extensive credits in both Argentina and Spain. He has also worked in Mexico, and was cast in his first English-language role in Red Lights.

Biography
Sbaraglia was born in Buenos Aires. His mother, Roxana Randon, is a local actress and theater coach. He started his acting career at the age of 16 in La Noche de los lápices, a political documentary drama directed by Héctor Olivera.

In 1987, he gained popularity among Argentine youth for his role in the TV series Clave de sol. In the following years, he starred in TV and film productions as well as in theatre (such as La Soledad de los Campos de Algodon, Closer). In 1993, he worked for the first time together with Argentine director Marcelo Piñeyro in Tango feroz: la leyenda de Tanguito. They came together again for Caballos salvajes (1995), for which Leonardo Sbaraglia earned the Jury Prize for Best Acting at the Huelva International Film Festival, and later for Cenizas del paraíso (1997) and an acclaimed performance in Plata quemada (2000).

Sbaraglia emigrated to Spain in 1998. He starred with Eusebio Poncela in Intacto, a 2001 thriller directed by Juan Carlos Fresnadillo, and received a Goya Award for Best New Actor. Other starring roles of his include Deseo (2002), a Gerardo Vera film in which he plays at the sides of Leonor Watling and Cecilia Roth, and Carmen (2003), an adaptation of Prosper Mérimée's classic by director Vicente Aranda.

Sbaraglia worked again in 2005 with director Antonio Hernández, with whom he had already shot En la ciudad sin límites in 2002. This and his contribution to Sebastián Borensztein's mini TV series Tiempo final (2000) after their production of El garante, for which he earned the Martín Fierro Award for best performance by an actor; Hernández and Piñeyro are the only directors with whom Sbaraglia has worked with more than once.

He was nominated for the Goya Award for Best Supporting Actor in 2007 for his role of Jesús Irurre in the film Salvador (Puig Antich) in which he starred with German actor Daniel Brühl. The City of Huelva awarded Sbaraglia an honorary award in 2005.

Sbaraglia returned to Argentina in 2008, and starred in Marcelo Piñeyro's Las viudas de los jueves in a role nominated for an Argentine Film Critics Association Silver Condor Award. Among his notable later roles are alongside Robert De Niro and Sigourney Weaver in Rodrigo Cortés' Red Lights (2012); and as one of two men in a caught in a road duel in Damián Szifrón's acclaimed Wild Tales (2014).

Family
Sbaraglia married the Argentine sculptor Guadalupe Martín in 2001; the couple has one child.

Filmography

Film

Television 
 Clave de Sol (1987)
 Atreverse (1990)
 Amores (1991)
 El gordo y el flaco (1991)
 Alta comedia (1991)
 Cartas de amor en cassette (1993)
 De poeta y de loco (1996)
 El garante (1997)
 Casablanca  (1998)
 Bajamar, la costa del silencio (1998)
 La argentina de tato (1999)
 Tiempo final (2000)
 Al filo de la ley (2005)
 Epitafios (2009)
 Impostores (2009)
 Lo que el tiempo nos dejó (2010)
 Dos lunas (2013)
 En terapia (2012–2014)
 Todos mienten (TBD)

Awards
International Emmy Awards

Goya Awards

Premios Sur

Silver Condor Awards

Screamfest Festival Trophy Awards
{| class="wikitable"
|- "
! Year || Category || Film || Award
|-
|2008||Best Actor||El rey de la montaña''|| style="background:#dfd;"|Winner
|}Martín Fierro AwardsHuelva International Film Festival'''

References

External links
 
 

1970 births
Living people
Male actors from Buenos Aires
Argentine people of Italian descent
Argentine male film actors
Argentine male television actors
20th-century Argentine male actors
21st-century Argentine male actors